Bushwacker is a pioneering streamliner slingshot dragster.

Originally built by Pete Ogden as Goldfinger, the car had a  wheelbase with dropped front axle and bicycle wheels, and an aluminum body (hammered by Arnie Roberts) which left the engine exposed but fendered the slicks.

The car was acquired by Don Honstein in 1965, repainted, and renamed Bushwacker. Driven by Ron Welty, who built the car's supercharged  Chrysler hemi, Bushwacker competed at three NHRA March Meets (at Bakersfield, California) and at local races before being sold again.

In 2006, it was restored.

Goldfinger
Goldfinger was a pioneering streamliner slingshot dragster.

Built by Pete Ogden to promote Tognotti's Speed Shop (Sacramento, California), the car debuted at the NHRA March Meet in 1964.  It had a  wheelbase, with dropped front axle and bicycle wheels, and a gold-painted aluminum body (hammered by Arnie Roberts) which left the engine exposed but fendered the slicks.

Power came from a supercharged  Chrysler hemi built by Ron Welty.

References

1960s cars
Drag racing cars
Rear-wheel-drive vehicles